Wu Yanan (born: November 30, 1986) is a retired Chinese wushu taolu and taijiquan athlete of Hui ethnicity.

Career 
At an early age, Wu was recommended to study taijiquan with the Shanxi wushu team under Xu Yuru. Wu later made his international debut at the 2005 East Asian Games where he won the gold medal in the taijiquan and taijijian combined event. A year later at the 2006 Asian Games, he won the gold medal in taijiquan. After winning the gold medal in taijiquan at the 2007 World Wushu Championships, he competed and won at the 2008 Beijing Wushu Tournament the 2009 World Games, and the 2010 Asian Games in the same combined event. His last competition was at the 2011 World Wushu Championships where he won a gold medal in taijijian.

See also 

 List of Asian Games medalists in wushu
 China national wushu team

References

External links 
 Athlete profile at the 2008 Beijing Wushu Tournament (archived)
 

1986 births
Living people
Chinese tai chi practitioners
Chinese wushu practitioners
Asian Games gold medalists for China
Asian Games medalists in wushu
Wushu practitioners at the 2006 Asian Games
Wushu practitioners at the 2010 Asian Games
Medalists at the 2006 Asian Games
Medalists at the 2010 Asian Games
World Games medalists in wushu
Competitors at the 2008 Beijing Wushu Tournament
Sportspeople from Xi'an